Saint Thillo (or Théau, Tillon, Thielman, Tilloine, Tilman, Tyllo) was a Saxon slave who was converted by Saint Eligius and became a priest at Solignac Abbey.
He accompanied Eloi in missionary work, returned to Solignac, and was made abbot.
Unable to handle the responsibility, he left the abbey and became a hermit.
His feast day is 7 January.

Life

Saint Thillo was kidnapped by bandits from his family in Saxony as a child.
He was sold as a slave to Saint Eligius, Bishop of Noyon, who freed him.
Eloi baptized him and treated him as his son.
Thillo apprenticed as a goldsmith at Solignac Abbey, then became a priest.
He accompanied Eloi on evangelical missions in Flanders and the Netherlands.

After Eloi died in 659 he became a hermit, living in Nedde (Haute Vienne) then Brageac (Cantal).
He returned to Limousin as an old man in 698 and was allowed to build a cell outside the walls of Solignac Abbey, near a market that would become the village of Le Vigen, where he died in 702 aged almost 100. 
His grave was later transferred to the Solignac abbey church.
The church of Saint Mathurin du Vigen was built on the site of the oratory where Thillo died, but no trace remains of the oratory.

Monks of Ramsgate account

The monks of St Augustine's Abbey, Ramsgate wrote in their Book of Saints (1921),

Butler's account

The hagiographer Alban Butler (1710–1773) wrote in his Lives of the Fathers, Martyrs, and Other Principal Saints under January 7,

Baring-Gould's account

Sabine Baring-Gould (1834–1924) in his Lives Of The Saints wrote under January 7,

Notes

Sources

  
  
 
 
  

Medieval French saints
608 births
702 deaths